Big D Jamboree was a radio program broadcast by KRLD-AM in Dallas, Texas. The show consisted of appearances by famous country musicians, and sketch comedy and jokes.
It was also carried by KRLD-TV during the 1950s.

History
Big D Jamboree began in 1947 as The Lone Star Barn Dance, but was renamed October 16, 1948. It was held in the Dallas Sportatorium. The show was initially produced by Al Turner and Ed McLemore, and then later by Johnny Hicks and Johnny Harper. The number of musicians who performed regularly rose from 20 to 50 by 1953. Around 1956, the CBS Radio Network began carrying the Big D Jamboree nationally. A number of later country stars appeared on the program, including Jimmy Lee Fautheree, Webb Pierce, Hank Locklin, Gene O'Quin and Billy Walker (who wore a mask and was billed as the Traveling Texan).

For many musicians, Big D Jamboree was a jumping point to larger shows, such as Louisiana Hayride or The Grand Ole Opry. KRLD-TV also broadcast a live Saturday-afternoon preview of the night's show in 1956, and by 1957, it was telecast live from the stage each Saturday night from 10–10:30 pm CT.

Since it was the only country music program in the Dallas area, it enjoyed years of great popularity toward the end of the 1950s, but lost listenership in the 1960s, eventually leading to its cancellation.

Performers
(in alphabetical order)

References

External links
Big D Jamboree at the Rockabilly Hall of Fame

Excerpt at RadioEchoes.com
American country music radio programs
Country music television series